The Abidjan Transport Company (abbreviated SOTRA) is the public transit provider for Abidjan, Ivory Coast and its suburbs. It is the first urban transport company organized in West Africa. SOTRA is a company that manages transit through its bus and water bus fleet. This company was created on December 16, 1960, to manage all modes of surface transportation, which were previously provided by private interests. Its status is that of a mixed economy company.

History
Before 1960, the public transport was made Abidjan in the traditional way with pinnaces on the lagoon and the van s brand Renault commonly called "thousand pounds" and carrying twenty passengers on a fixed route. Of cars carrying fewer than a dozen passengers on a fairly regular route and some taxi s completed means of displacement.

The 16 is created Abidjan Transport Company (SOTRA), a mixed economy company whose capital is owned 35% by the Ivorian government and 65% by private partners. SOTRA, under supervision of the Minister of Public Works and Transport, appears therefore as the first company organized urban transport of West Africa.

A concession agreement public service signed between the Ivorian government and SOTRA grants it the exclusive service transit passengers in the city of Abidjan. This agreement also provides for the removal vans called "thousand pounds" and other collective means of public transport, excluding taxis. From July 1964, the monopoly of Sotra the public transport passenger becomes effective in Abidjan. The company increases its sales so that it becomes truly beneficial when it had successive deficits experienced during the early years. The owners of taxis, which receive compensation in the form of authorizations for transmission lines on non-urban or thumbnails to operate taxis counters.

The initial capital of SOTRA 50 million in 1960 rose to 800 million in 1974 and FCFA 3 billion F CFA in 1983. It is held in 2009 by the Ivorian government (60.13%), Irisbus / Iveco (39.80%) and the District of Abidjan (0.07%).

Organisation
SOTRA group is a company public financial participation of Ivorian law. It is governed principally by the Uniform Act on Commercial Companies and Economic Interest Grouping (OHADA). Its organization is based around a branch of a management audit of the general and operational management (operations management, management of human resources development, administrative and financial management, corporate communications and marketing, direction of the organization and quality management studies and prospective management of IT and new technologies, management of general resources) that three subsidiaries: SOTRA Industries Institute SOTRA SOTRA and Tourism.

Means of production 

The company operates 526 buses in standard mode, 145 express bus mode, 117 buses and 26 passenger boat bus.

The staff is divided among 223 managers, 355 senior technicians,  supervisors and  employees who work for a network of 68 urban routes, 12 express lines, 3 lines Waterbuses 2 lines Taxi luggage and online school. Average daily travels SOTRA  and transports  passengers.

Modernisation

SOTRA buses were equipped with a ticketing system computer (BAO), which is installed in buses SOTRA a mini computer or precoded console capable of emitting titles directly transport form of receipt with all the travel data (date, time, line, position ...).

For its part, the city of Strasbourg R312 5 bus offered to the company. In total, 300 new vehicles were promised by the Prime Minister at the time, Guillaume Soro. This renewal is part of a comprehensive plan to rehabilitate buses Abidjan and recovery of the company. The cost of the operation is estimated at 4.7 billion CFA francs.

Tourism SOTRA
SOTRA Tourism & Travel is a subsidiary of SOTRA which offers trips in almost all countries around the cars, boats and airplanes by professionals tourism.

Means of transport
 Airplane
 Bus
 Ferry boat
 Car

References

Transport in Abidjan
Companies based in Abidjan
Transport companies of Ivory Coast
Transport companies established in 1960
Ivorian companies established in 1960